CMAS two-star scuba diver (also known as CMAS P2 diver, CMAS** diver, or just CMAS**) is a diving certification for recreational scuba diving issued by the Confédération Mondiale des Activités Subaquatiques (CMAS).

It indicates that the diver has been assessed as competent to plan and undertake dives to a maximum depth of 30 metres, or with some additional experience, 40 meters, accompanied by another diver with a recognised equivalent or higher certification, with no requirement for a dive leader.

Principle

Equivalent certifications 
The Confédération mondiale des activités subaquatiques (world underwater federation) was created in 1959 to bring consistency between different national diving certification systems.

As a result, the CMAS two-star diver certification is usually delivered as an equivalence to a national two-star diver certification delivered through a federation affiliated to the CMAS Technical Committee.

Course details

References 

Diving qualifications